Czechoslovak basketball clubs in European and worldwide competitions is the performance record of men's professional basketball clubs from the former country of Czechoslovakia's top-tier level league, the Czechoslovak Basketball League, that played in international basketball tournaments.

The finals

FIBA European Champions Cup (1st tier)

Season to season

FIBA European Cup Winners' Cup (2nd tier)

Season to season

FIBA Korać Cup (3rd tier)

Season to season

See also
European basketball clubs in European and worldwide competitions from:
 Croatia
 France
 Greece
 Israel
 Italy
 Russia
 Spain
 Turkey
 USSR
 Yugoslavia

Basketball in Czechoslovakia